The Avro 530 was a British two-seat fighter biplane designed in 1916 to compete with the Bristol F.2A. The plane itself was designed in 1916, but not flown until July 1917. It was of fabric-covered wooden construction, powered by a 200 hp (150 kW) Hispano-Suiza engine.

Operational history
Although performance of the Avro 530 proved to be good, it did not improve sufficiently on the Bristol F.2A and as such no production orders were issued. Another issue was that priority for the Hispano-Suiza engines which powered the 530 was being given to the S.E.5a. In 1918, a second 530 was fitted with a 200 hp (150 kW) Sunbeam Arab engine, but development was subsequently abandoned.

Specifications (first prototype)

References

Further reading

 

1910s British fighter aircraft
530
Aircraft first flown in 1917
Biplanes